Cheenu Pillai is a self-taught artist from Chennai, India who blends European expressionism with dravidian themes.

Career
Cheenu Pillai was born in 1971 in a village in Tanjore district. He spent his school days in his village and then in Tanjore. Cheenu took to painting at very early age, thanks to his elder brother who was artist himself.  Brought up in a pious background, portraits of gods used to be his favorite theme. At that age, his rendering of the religious images fulfilled purely a spiritual need. But as he delved more into the forms, the symmetry and balance in the Hindu iconography captured his imagination.

He kept pursuing art with passion all his life, but never considered taking it up as a career. For a consistent topper at school, the only career choice seemed like a white collar job, which is exactly where he ended up. He did his MBA and got into investment banking. Emerging opportunities in information technology led him shift career midway, but art continued as the primary passion. His inspirations heightened during his stint in Europe, where he regularly frequented art galleries.

In 2003, he decided to take up art more seriously and quit his job as the president of a large software company. Though he continued doing the consultancy works in a software firm, he was able to spend more time in painting.

Apparao galleries included Cheenu's works as part of a group show in 2004. Again in 2007, A.v.ilango's art space and Tangerine art sponsored an exhibition of his paintings from the divinity series at the tangerine restaurant, which gave him the initial impetus. Cheenu was part of a group show at Apparao galleries in 2009

Style
Cheenu Pillai has evolved a unique style of representation which is hybrid between European movements like cubism, expressionism, orphism and Indian sensibilities in terms of color schemes and layouts.

References

External links 
 Paintings of Cheenu Pillai

Indian male painters
People from Thanjavur district
Orphism (art)
1971 births
Living people
21st-century Indian painters
Indian Expressionist painters
Painters from Tamil Nadu
20th-century Indian male artists
21st-century Indian male artists